para-Methoxyphenylpiperazine (MeOPP, pMPP, 4-MPP; Paraperazine) is a piperazine derivative with stimulant effects which has been sold as an ingredient in "Party pills", initially in New Zealand and subsequently in other countries around the world.

Pharmacology
MeOPP is anecdotally said to induce significantly less anxiety than similar piperazines, and is usually taken at doses between 120–200 mg. It does not produce prominent stimulant effects, but is instead said to be relaxing, however it is often mixed with stimulant piperazine derivatives such as benzylpiperazine (BZP) for a combined effect.

MeOPP has been found in vitro to inhibit the reuptake and induce the release of the monoamine neurotransmitters. This is a mechanism of action shared with drugs of abuse such as amphetamines, and MeOPP produces somewhat similar effects although it is much less potent and is thought to have relatively insignificant abuse potential. Piperazine derivatives such as trifluoromethylphenylpiperazine (TFMPP) have also been shown to exert a major part of their mechanism of action as nonselective serotonin receptor agonists, and MeOPP has also been demonstrated to act in this way.

Legal status

New Zealand
Based on the recommendation of the EACD, the New Zealand government has passed legislation which placed BZP, along with a number of other piperazine derivatives into Class C of the New Zealand Misuse of Drugs Act 1975. A ban was intended to come into effect in New Zealand on December 18, 2007, but the law change did not go through until the following year, and the sale of BZP and the other listed piperazines became illegal in New Zealand as of 1 April 2008. An amnesty for possession and usage of these drugs remained until October 2008, at which point they became completely illegal.

United States
MeOPP is not scheduled at the federal level in the United States.

Florida
"Methoxyphenylpiperazine" is a Schedule I controlled substance in the state of Florida making it illegal to buy, sell, or possess in Florida.

See also 
 Substituted piperazine
Acta Crystallogr. (2020). E76,  1779-1793

https://doi.org/10.1107/S2056989020014097

Fifteen 4-(2-meth­oxy­phen­yl)piperazin-1-ium salts containing organic anions: supramolecular assembly in zero, one, two and three dimensions 
C.  Harish Chinthal, C. N.  Kavitha, H. S.  Yathirajan, S.  Foro, R. S.  Rathore and C.  Glidewell

Acta Crystallogr. (2019). E75,  1494-1506

https://doi.org/10.1107/S2056989019012702

Twelve 4-(4-meth­oxy­phen­yl)piperazin-1-ium salts containing organic anions: supramolecular assembly in one, two and three dimensions 
H.  Kiran Kumar, H. S.  Yathirajan, S.  Foro and C.  Glidewell

References

External links

 
Serotonin receptor agonists
Monoamine releasing agents
Designer drugs